Oskar G. Stonorov House is a historic home located in Charlestown Township, Chester County, Pennsylvania. It was built in 1938, from the stone walls of an existing stone and frame farmhouse.  It is "L"-shaped, as was the farmhouse, with frame walls sheathed in cypress.  It features large window openings, and a flat roof with parapet or thin edge overhang.  A guest house was added to the property in the early 1950s.  It was designed by its owner, architect Oskar Stonorov.

It was added to the National Register of Historic Places in 1975.  It is located in the Middle Pickering Rural Historic District.

References

Houses on the National Register of Historic Places in Pennsylvania
Houses completed in 1938
Houses in Chester County, Pennsylvania
National Register of Historic Places in Chester County, Pennsylvania
Individually listed contributing properties to historic districts on the National Register in Pennsylvania